Meenmutty Falls is a waterfall located  from Trivandrum city in Thiruvananthapuram District in the Indian state of Kerala, India. The falls are located near the Ponmudi hill station, Thiruvananthapuram district and Agastya Mala Biosphere reserves. This waterfalls is situated along the upper riparian course of Vamanapuram River.

Location 
There is no transportation is available so visitors have to trek 2 km through the dense forests to reach the falls. The nearby road head is Kallar on Vithura- Ponmudi road.

There is also a waterfall bearing same name that exist at Wayanad district of Kerala.

See also 

 Peppara Wildlife Sanctuary
 Agastya Mala

External links

Meenmutty Waterfalls

References 

Tourist attractions in Thiruvananthapuram district
Waterfalls of Kerala
Geography of Thiruvananthapuram district